The 2011 Syracuse Orange football team represented Syracuse University in the 2011 NCAA Division I FBS football season. The Orange were led by third year head coach Doug Marrone and played their home games at the Carrier Dome. They are a member of the Big East Conference. They finished the season 5–7, 1–6 in Big East play to finish in a tie for seventh place.

Schedule

Roster

References

Syracuse
Syracuse Orange football seasons
Syracuse Orange football